I Killed or I Slew (Swedish: Jag dräpte) is a 1943 Swedish drama film directed by Olof Molander and starring Anders Henrikson, Arnold Sjöstrand and Irma Christenson. It was shot at the Centrumateljéerna Studios in Stockholm. The film's sets were designed by the art director Bibi Lindström. It is a remake of the 1942 Norwegian film Jeg drepte!.

Synopsis
A surgeon believes he has killed a man on the operating table.

Cast
 Anders Henrikson as Hans Greger 
 Arnold Sjöstrand as Richard Cornell
 Irma Christenson as 	Liv Cornell
 Tollie Zellman as 	Mrs. Lilly Smith
 Marianne Löfgren as 	Mrs. Berg
 Hilda Borgström as 	Miss Ruth Miller
 Gunnar Sjöberg as 	Martin
 Alf Kjellin as 	Harris
 Tore Lindwall as Paul Rogers
 Gunnar Björnstrand as 	Lindén
 Gabriel Alw as 	Dr. Zander
 Siri Olson as 	Nurse Berit
 Mai Zetterling as Miss Peters
 Aurore Palmgren as 	Head Nurse
 Anna Lindahl as Mrs. Tomsen
 Kolbjörn Knudsen as 	Allen 
 Lennart Holmqvist as 	Medical Candidate 
 Nils Dahlgren as 	Butler
 John Botvid as Mr. Smith
 Margareta Fahlén as Nurse Vera
 Marianne Gyllenhammar as 	Nurse 
 Mimi Nelson as 	Nurse 
 Gunnel Wadner as Switchboard Operator

References

Bibliography 
 Qvist, Per Olov & von Bagh, Peter. Guide to the Cinema of Sweden and Finland. Greenwood Publishing Group, 2000.

External links 
 

1943 films
Swedish drama films
1943 drama films
1940s Swedish-language films
Films directed by Olof Molander
Swedish black-and-white films
Remakes of Norwegian films
1940s Swedish films